Černošín is a town in Tachov District in the Plzeň Region of the Czech Republic. It has about 1,100 inhabitants.

Administrative parts
Villages of Krásné Údolí, Lažany, Lhota, Ostrovce, Pytlov, Třebel, Víchov and Záhoří are administrative parts of Černošín.

History
The first written mention of Černošín is from 1155, but this document has not been preserved. The next mention of Černošín is from 1290. In 1541, it was promoted to a town.

Twin towns – sister cities

Černošín is twinned with:
 Pullenreuth, Germany

References

External links

Cities and towns in the Czech Republic
Populated places in Tachov District